Eddie Carmel (born Oded Ha-Carmeili ; March 16, 1936 – August 14, 1972) was an Israeli-born American entertainer with gigantism and subsequent acromegaly resulting from a pituitary adenoma. He was popularly known as "The Jewish Giant", "The Happy Giant," and "The World's Biggest Cowboy." He was variously a mutual funds salesman, carnival sideshow act, film actor, rock and roll band singer, and stand-up comedian. He was made famous by photographer Diane Arbus' picture Jewish Giant, taken at Home with His Parents in the Bronx, N.Y. in 1970, a print of which sold at auction for $421,000 in 2007 ($ in current dollar terms). At the time of his death at age 36, he had shrunk several inches, due to kyphoscoliosis.

Early life 
Carmel was born Oded Ha-Carmeili in Jaffa, Mandatory Palestine, to Orthodox Jewish immigrants, weighing 16 pounds, and was Jewish. An only child, he was raised in the Bronx, New York, after his parents Isaac (Itzhak; an insurance salesman born in Poland) and Miriam (née Pines) Ha-Carmeili (born in the United States, and later a secretary at the Jewish Theological Seminary) relocated back to the United States when he was two years old so his mother could care for an ailing relative. His parents were 5 feet 6 inches tall, but his maternal grandfather in Poland was known as the tallest rabbi in the world, at 7 feet 5 inches (226 cm). He lived with his parents on Elgar Place in Co-op City in the Bronx.

At 10 years of age Carmel was 6 feet 1 inch tall. At 15 years of age he was 6 feet 6 inches tall, and was diagnosed with gigantism and acromegaly.  When he graduated Taft High School in 1954 he was 7 feet tall. He studied at City College of New York for two years where he was elected vice president of his class, majoring in business and joining the Dramatic Club, and Baruch College.

Carmel was listed by the Guinness Book of World Records as 9 feet (274 cm) tall, and billed at the heights of 8 ft 9 in (268 cm) and 9 ft 0.625 inches (276 cm) tall, though he may have more realistically been around 7 ft 3 tall. He had a size 24 shoe.  He was popularly known as "The Jewish Giant," "The Happy Giant," and "The World's Biggest Cowboy." 
"Eddie" was his nickname from his youth, and Carmel was a stage surname.

Career 
In 1958, Carmel sold mutual funds at an office near Times Square in Manhattan, New York City.

Due to his condition, Carmel's primary work was in carnival sideshows, including appearances at Hubert's Dime Museum and Flea Circus on West 42nd Street in Times Square, Milt Levine's World of Mirth show, and in the 1960s in Ringling Bros. and Barnum & Bailey Circus (which billed him as being 9 feet and 5/8 of an inch tall, and 500 pounds). He also acted in a few films, such as the science fiction horror film The Brain That Wouldn't Die (1962) and 50,000 B.C. (Before Clothing) (1963).

He formed and played with a rock and roll band, Frankenstein and the Brain Surgeons.  Carmel also recorded two novelty 45 records, "The Happy Giant" and "The Good Monster," and the single "The Happy Monster's Song".

For a time Carmel, with his best friend, Irwin Sherman, worked together as stand-up comedians in New York. He stopped working in 1969, as his physical condition and arthritis made movement difficult, and he required two canes when he walked, later a wheelchair, and ultimately he was unable to get out of bed.

Carmel was made famous by photographer Diane Arbus' picture Jewish Giant, taken at Home with His Parents in the Bronx, N.Y. in 1970, his back arched against the low ceiling of the  apartment where he lived with his parents, when he was 34 years old, two years before his death. As the photo was taken, he joked: "Isn't it awful to have midget parents?" Arbus remarked on her photo, "You know how every mother has nightmares when she’s pregnant that her baby will be born a monster? … I think I got that in the mother’s face…" The photo inspired his cousin to make an audio documentary about him in 1999. A print of the photo was sold at auction for $421,000 ($ in current dollar terms) in 2007. A print of the photo was sold at a Christie's auction for $583,500 ($ in current dollar terms) in 2017.

Death

On August 14, 1972, Carmel died of a heart attack at age 36, in Montefiore Hospital in the Bronx, New York. At the time of his funeral, he had shrunk several inches, due to kyphoscoliosis (curvature of the spine, a mixture of scoliosis and kyphosis).

References

External links 
"The Jewish Giant," documentary video radio segment, Sound Portraits Productions, the predecessor to StoryCorps.
"Eddie Carmel (The Jewish Giant). The Happy Giant/Radar Records 1962," video.

Eddie Carmel at Find A Grave.

People with acromegaly
People with gigantism
American people of Polish-Jewish descent
Israeli people of Polish-Jewish descent
1936 births
1972 deaths
Israeli emigrants to the United States
20th-century Israeli Jews
People from Tel Aviv
People from the Bronx
People from Co-op City, Bronx
City College of New York alumni
Baruch College alumni
Sideshow performers
American male film actors
Israeli male film actors
20th-century American male actors
20th-century Israeli male actors
Vaudeville performers
Ringling Bros. and Barnum & Bailey Circus people
American male comedians
Israeli male comedians
American stand-up comedians
Israeli stand-up comedians